Back in Circulation is a 1937 American film directed by Ray Enright and starring  Pat O'Brien and Joan Blondell. Based on  the short story "Angle Shooter" by Adela Rogers St. Johns, Blondell plays a fast-moving newspaper reporter who senses a story when she spots a young recent widow partying in a night club. This film is preserved in the Library of Congress collection.

Plot
The top reporter on the Chronicle is a woman, "Timmy" Blake, who is engaged to marry Bill Morgan, her editor. Morgan assigns her to investigate the death of wealthy Spencer Wade, who left a note implicating Eugene Forde, his doctor.

Timmy believes that the victim's widow, Arline, is responsible. She goes to nightclub owner Sam Sherman to find out the name of a man Arline was seen with there. It turns out to be Carlton Whitney, a known gigolo.

Arline sues for libel when Timmy publishes a story implicating her. She is placed on trial for murder. It turns out Whitney has been blackmailing her, but when Wade suspected her of an affair, his suicide note implicated Forde by mistake. Timmy and Morgan get the story straightened out, and Arline ends up marrying the doctor.

Cast 
 Pat O'Brien as Bill Morgan
 Joan Blondell as Timothea 'Timmy' Blake
 Margaret Lindsay as Arline Wade
 John Litel as Dr. Eugene Forde
 Eddie Acuff as Murphy
 Craig Reynolds as 'Snoopy' Davis
 George E. Stone as Mac 
 Walter Byron as Carlton Whitney
 Ben Welden as Sam Sherman
 Regis Toomey as Buck
 Raymond Brown as Attorney Bottsford
 Gordon Hart as Dr. Hanley 
 Granville Bates as The Coroner
 Herbert Rawlinson as District Attorney Saunders
 Spencer Charters as Plattstown Sheriff
 unbilled players include Frank Faylen, Edward Gargan, and Milton Kibbee

References

External links 
 
 
 
 

1937 films
1937 comedy-drama films
American black-and-white films
American comedy-drama films
Films about journalists
Films based on works by Adela Rogers St. Johns
Films directed by Ray Enright
Films produced by Samuel Bischoff
Films scored by Heinz Roemheld
Warner Bros. films
1930s English-language films
1930s American films
Films scored by Bernhard Kaun
Films based on short fiction
Films about gigolos
Films about widowhood